Greete is a hamlet and civil parish in Shropshire, England.

To the west flows Ledwyche Brook, which is the border with Herefordshire. The area is hilly and through the middle of the parish flows the Stoke Brook.

There is a church, dedicated to St James, which remains in use by the Church of England (Greete falling within the Diocese of Hereford).

See also
Listed buildings in Greete

References

Civil parishes in Shropshire
Villages in Shropshire